Johann Philipp Christfeld (born 1796 or 1797 – 6 January 1874) was a German porcelain painter.

Christfeld was born in Frankenthal. He is recorded  as living at Lerchen Straße 42 in Munich in around 1850. Christfeld died in Munich in 1874.

See also
 List of German painters

References 

19th-century German painters
19th-century German male artists
German male painters
1790s births
1874 deaths